The 2000 Belmont Stakes was the 132nd running of the Belmont Stakes and the 96th time the event took place at Belmont Park in Elmont, New York.

In a field of 11 horses, the 1 1/2-mile race was won by Commendable.

Payout 

 $2 Exacta (3-5) paid $213.00
 $2 Trifecta (3-5-4) paid $1,310.00
 $2 Superfecta (3-5-4-9) paid $9,315.00

Full results

See also
 2000 Kentucky Derby
 2000 Preakness Stakes

References

Belmont Stakes races
Belmont Stakes
Belmont Stakes
Belmont Stakes
Belmont Stakes